Tangxun Lake, formerly Tangsun Lake, is a freshwater lake between Hongshan District and Jiangxia District in southeastern Wuhan, the capital of Hubei Province, China. It is south of Wuhan's Third Ring Road and north of its Fourth Ring Road. Tangxun Lake is the largest lake completely enclosed by a city in Asia.

Before a 1997 decision by the Jiangxia District government, Tangxun Lake was called Tang-Sun Lake. According to tradition, two families surnamed Tang and Sun lived in two of the bays of the lake, hence the name Tang-Sun Lake.

As of May 2014, due to the expansion of Wuhan, Tangxun Lake was recognized as the largest lake in Wuhan in the official Wuhan Lake Records. Tangxun Lake surpassed East Lake and claimed the title of the 'Largest Lake entirely within a City in China and Asia'.

Tangxun Lake is the site of recreation and residential areas, including man-made peninsulas extending into the lake. The Tangxun Lake Recreational Area is divided into three recreational areas: 'Rural' Park (including a fishing center); Water Sports Recreation Area (combination of tourism and competitive sports; yacht racing area, rowing center and swimming pool); and Summer Recreational Area, (business center, office buildings, news center, a layer of shopping center, swimming pool, professional training and the gym, etc). The scenic spots are both connected and relatively independent. The Tangxun Lake Resort Area was developed by the Hubei Huatai Land Industry Co., Ltd. 

Tangxun Lake Railway Station and Miaoshan Railway Station, located on the northern and southern shores of Tangxun Lake are stops on the Wuhan–Xianning intercity railway.

The Science and Technology Park of Huazhong University of Science and Technology is located on the north shore of Tangxun Lake. Wuhan Donghu University was established on the western shore of Tangxun Lake in 1980. Wuhan Institute of Design and Sciences was established on the eastern shore of Tangxun Lake in 2015.

References

Tourist attractions in Wuhan
Lakes of Wuhan